Adam McLeish (born 7 June 1979) is a British sportsman who specializes in snowboarding. He competed at the 2010 Winter Olympic Games in the "Men's Parallel Giant Slalom" and came 24th with a total time of 1:21.09.

References

External links
 
 

1979 births
British male snowboarders
Living people
Olympic snowboarders of Great Britain
People from Pointe-Claire
Snowboarders at the 2010 Winter Olympics
Sportspeople from Quebec